Bearnese refers to anything of or relating to Béarn, especially the Bearnais people meaning native of Béarn, and may refer directly to the following articles:
 Béarnese dialect
 Béarnaise sauce
 Béarnaise cattle
 Basco-béarnaise, a type of sheep
 Béarnaise dance